Makira may refer to:

Makira, an island in the Solomon Islands
Makira-Ulawa Province, a province in the Solomon Islands
Makira or Makura, an island in Vanuatu
Makira Natural Park, a protected area in Madagascar

Fauna of the Solomon Islands 
Makira moorhen, (Gallinula silvestris) a species of bird in the family Rallidae
Makira thrush, (Zoothera margaretae) a species of bird in the family Turdidae
Makira leaf-warbler, (Phylloscopus makirensis) a species of bird in the family Sylviidae
Makira flying fox, (Pteropus cognatus) a species of bat in the family Pteropodidae